Naci Şensoy (born 20 February 1958) is a Kosovar-Turkish football manager and former player, who is the current head coach of Bylis in the Kategoria Superiore.

Playing career
Born in Prizren, Yugoslavia, he moved to Turkey where he began his footballing career, where he played for Manisaspor and Vanspor.

Coaching career
Following his playing career, he begin his coaching career in Turkey, becoming assistant manager in Istanbulspor. Afterwards, he managed a couple of lower league Turkish clubs, before taking Azerbaijani PFC Turan Tovuz. He managed a number of Bulgarian clubs, being Lokomotiv Plovdiv the last in the succession. On July 2, 2011, he took charge of Serbian SuperLiga club FK BSK Borča, however after only a month, he left even before the season had started. Şensoy took over as head coach of Pirin Blagoevgrad in October 2015, being credited with improving the fortunes for the team that was firmly rooted to the bottom of the A PFG standings at the time of his appointment. Under Şensoy's management, Pirin managed to avoid relegation at the end of the season.

References

1958 births
Living people
Sportspeople from Prizren
Kosovan Turks
Yugoslav people of Turkish descent
Turkish people of Kosovan descent
Association football midfielders
Turkish footballers
Kosovan footballers
Manisaspor footballers
Vanspor footballers
Turkish football managers
Kosovan football managers
Turan-Tovuz IK managers
OFC Belasitsa Petrich managers
PFC Pirin Blagoevgrad managers
OFC Vihren Sandanski managers
PFC Lokomotiv Plovdiv managers
FK BSK Borča managers
KF Bylis Ballsh managers
FK Kukësi managers
FK Pelister managers
FK Makedonija Gjorče Petrov managers
Kategoria Superiore managers
Yugoslav expatriate sportspeople in Turkey
Kosovan expatriate football managers
Turkish expatriate sportspeople in Azerbaijan
Expatriate football managers in Azerbaijan
Kosovan expatriate sportspeople in Azerbaijan
Expatriate football managers in Bulgaria
Kosovan expatriates in Bulgaria
Expatriate football managers in Serbia
Expatriate football managers in Albania
Kosovan expatriates in Albania
Expatriate football managers in North Macedonia
Kosovan expatriates in North Macedonia
Turkish expatriate football managers